Matthew James Blair (born 21 June 1989) is a former English professional footballer who last played as a right back for  club Cheltenham Town.

Blair started his career with Racing Club Warwick and after one season with the club signed for Stratford Town in 2008. He left for Bedworth United a year later, before going on to have spells with Redditch United and A.F.C. Telford United in the Conference North. He joined Kidderminster Harriers of the Conference Premier in 2010 and after one season signed for York City. He scored in the 2012 FA Trophy Final and 2012 Conference Premier play-off Final at Wembley Stadium, and his winning goal in the latter saw York promoted into League Two. After one season with York in League Two, Blair signed for divisional rivals Fleetwood Town in 2013 and was released in January 2015.

Club career

Early career
Born in Warwick, Warwickshire, Blair started his career in the Midland Football Alliance with his hometown club, Racing Club Warwick, in the 2007–08 season. He signed for Stratford Town of the Midland Football Alliance on 7 July 2008. After signing, manager Micky Moore said of Blair: "He had an excellent season with Racing Club Warwick and I feel coming to Stratford and its environment will make him a better player". He finished 2008–09 with seven goals in 40 league appearances for Stratford.

Blair signed for Southern League Division One Central club Bedworth United on 3 June 2009. He scored four times for Bedworth in 16 appearances before signing for Conference North club Redditch United on 25 November 2009. Having made 15 appearances and scored two goals for Redditch, Blair moved on again, signing for Conference North rivals A.F.C. Telford United on 19 March 2010. He finished 2009–10 with one goal in seven appearances for Telford.

Kidderminster Harriers
Blair signed for Conference Premier club Kidderminster Harriers on 9 August 2010 on non-contract terms following a trial. He made his debut on 14 August 2010 as a 75th-minute substitute in Kidderminster's 2010–11 opening day 2–1 victory away to York City. His first goal for the club came after scoring with a low shot in the 75th minute of a 2–1 win at home to Gateshead on 5 October 2010. In the following match, Blair scored twice as Kidderminster beat Grimsby Town 3–2 on 10 October 2010. Blair signed a contract until the end of 2010–11 on 18 October 2010. His first hat-trick for Kidderminster came after scoring all three of their goals in a 3–3 draw away to Grimsby on 9 April 2011, including an 83rd-minute equaliser after latching onto a loose ball in the penalty area. He finished the season with 11 goals in 45 appearances for Kidderminster.

York City

After turning down a new contract with Kidderminster, Blair signed for Conference Premier rivals York City on 1 June 2011 on a two-year contract. A compensation package was agreed by the two clubs later that month. He made his debut in York's opening match of 2011–12, a 2–1 victory away to Ebbsfleet United on 13 August 2011. His first goal came in the following match with York's final goal in a 3–1 victory at home to Barrow on 16 August 2011, with a sidefooted shot from six yards in the fifth minute of stoppage time. Blair scored the equaliser to give York a 1–1 away draw to Luton Town in the FA Trophy semi-final second leg with a 90th-minute header from a Jamal Fyfield cross. York progressed to the final with a 2–1 aggregate victory.

With a 111th-minute header from a Jason Walker cross, Blair scored the winning goal for York away to Mansfield Town during extra time of their play-off semi-final second leg on 7 May 2012. He scored the opening goal for York in their 2–0 victory over Newport County in the 2012 FA Trophy Final at Wembley Stadium on 12 May 2012, after lifting the ball 20 yards into an empty net after goalkeeper Glyn Thompson had charged out of his goal. Eight days later, Blair scored the winning goal in York's 2–1 victory over Luton in the 2012 Conference Premier play-off Final at Wembley Stadium. He scored in the 47th minute with a sidefooted shot from four yards after the ball was head down by Daniel Parslow, and the goal was allowed despite Blair being in an offside position. This result meant York were promoted into League Two after an eight-year absence from the Football League. He finished his first season at York as top scorer with 20 goals in 52 appearances, and was named in the 2011–12 Conference Premier Team of the Year alongside York teammate James Meredith.

Blair came on as a 78th-minute substitute in York's 2012–13 opener away to League One team Doncaster Rovers in the League Cup first round on 11 August 2012. Following a 1–1 draw after extra time the team lost 4–2 in a penalty shoot-out, with Blair missing the final penalty kick. He then entered York's first Football League fixture since their promotion, a 3–1 defeat at home to Wycombe Wanderers on 18 August 2012, as a 56th-minute substitute. His first goal of the season came with the 80th-minute winner in York's 1–0 victory away to Rotherham United in the Football League Trophy first round Northern section. He finished the season with seven goals in 49 appearances.

Fleetwood Town
Following discussions with York manager Nigel Worthington, Blair expressed his desire to look for another club, and was in talks with newly relegated League Two club Portsmouth before asking for more time to consider the move. However, he signed for League Two rivals Fleetwood Town on a two-year contract on 13 May 2013.

Blair joined fellow League Two club Northampton Town on 10 January 2014 on a one-month loan. He made his debut the following day in a 2–0 home defeat to former club York, before scoring a 76th-minute equaliser for Northampton in their 1–1 away draw with Cheltenham Town on 1 February 2014. His loan was ended on 5 February 2014, three days ahead of when it was due to expire, having made three appearances and scored one goal for Northampton. Blair scored the only goal in the play-off semi-final against his former club York, and started for Fleetwood in their 1–0 win over Burton Albion in the 2014 League Two play-off Final at Wembley Stadium on 26 May. This result meant they were promoted into League One for the first time in their history. He finished 2013–14 with 33 appearances and five goals for Fleetwood.

On 17 November 2014, Blair joined League Two club Cambridge United on loan until January 2015.

Mansfield Town
Blair signed for League Two club Mansfield Town on a contract until the end of 2014–15 on 14 January 2015 after leaving Fleetwood by mutual consent.

Doncaster Rovers
Blair rejected a new contract with Mansfield to sign for newly relegated League Two club Doncaster Rovers on 24 May 2016 on a two-year contract. He made 48 appearances and scored 3 goals in 2016–17 as Doncaster were promoted to League One after finishing third in League Two.

He was named as PFA League One Community Player of the Year in both seasons 2017–18 and 2018–19. In April 2019, Blair was also named as Community Champion by the PFA for the 2018–19 season in recognition of all his community services.

Cheltenham Town
Blair rejected a new contract offered by Doncaster, and was signed by Cheltenham Town at the beginning of September 2020 on a one year contract. He made his debut for the club on 8 September 2020 in an EFL Trophy group stage away win over Newport County.

On 12 September 2022, Blair announced his retirement from football due to injury.

International career
Blair made his England national C team debut as a 56th-minute substitute for Connor Franklin in a 1–0 defeat at home to Portugal in the 2009–11 International Challenge Trophy on 19 May 2011. His second and final cap came after starting England's 1–1 draw at home to Italy in the 2011–13 International Challenge Trophy on 28 February 2012.

Personal life
Blair is the son of former professional footballer Andy Blair. His sister-in-law is actress Holly Matthews, who was married to his brother Ross up until his death from a brain tumour.

Career statistics

Honours

York City
Conference Premier play-offs: 2012
FA Trophy: 2011–12

Fleetwood Town
Football League Two play-offs: 2014

Doncaster Rovers
EFL League Two third-place promotion: 2016–17

Cheltenham Town
League Two: 2020–21

Individual
Conference Premier Team of the Year: 2011–12

References

External links

Profile  at the Doncaster Rovers F.C. website

1989 births
Living people
People from Warwick
Sportspeople from Warwickshire
English footballers
England semi-pro international footballers
Association football wingers
Association football fullbacks
Racing Club Warwick F.C. players
Stratford Town F.C. players
Bedworth United F.C. players
Redditch United F.C. players
AFC Telford United players
Kidderminster Harriers F.C. players
York City F.C. players
Fleetwood Town F.C. players
Northampton Town F.C. players
Cambridge United F.C. players
Mansfield Town F.C. players
Doncaster Rovers F.C. players
Cheltenham Town F.C. players
Midland Football Alliance players
Southern Football League players
National League (English football) players
English Football League players
English people of Scottish descent